Telegrame is a 1959 Romanian comedy film directed by  and Gheorghe Naghi and starring Grigore Vasiliu Birlic. The film, based on the eponymous sketch by Ion Luca Caragiale, premiered in Romania on 1 March 1960. It was entered into the 1960 Cannes Film Festival.

Cast
 Coca Andronescu as the prosecutor's daughter
 Marcel Anghelescu as Popic
 Costache Antoniu as Antonache Pamfil
  as Raul Grigorașcu
  as the guard Zapcianu
 Jules Cazaban as Iordăchel Gudurău
 Ștefan Ciubotărașu as the owner of the café
  as general Grigorașcu
 
 Fory Etterle as a Minister
 Mihai Fotino as the Minister of Interior
 Alexandru Giugaru as the County Court prosecutor
  as the Lady
  as the bandmaster
 
  as the sweeper
 
  as the general's servant
  as Iorgu, the Prime Minister
 Draga Olteanu as a commenting wife
  as a pool player
 Dem Rădulescu as another pool player
  as the Minister of Justice
  as Jenică
 Carmen Stănescu as Atenaisa Perjoiu
  as woman in love with Turturel
  as Albert Gudurău
  as Mr. Turturel
 Grigore Vasiliu Birlic as Costăchel Gudurău
 Unknown yet as telegraph operator Crudela

References

External links

1959 films
1959 comedy films
Romanian comedy films
1950s Romanian-language films
Romanian black-and-white films
Films directed by Gheorghe Naghi